Awan Inspirasi Sdn Bhd (doing business as Awan Inspirasi) was an offshore helicopter service company based in Miri, Malaysia. Awan Inspirasi operated a strategic alliance with CHC Helicopter Services (CHC). However, due to the fatal Norway crash in 2016 that involved a H225, killing all passengers and crew on board, CHC and Awan Inspirasi was forced to split up. Eventually due to aggressive competitors in Malaysia, Awan Inspirasi was unable to compete with the market which led to the decision of the shareholders to pull out. 
It mostly transported Petronas Carigali Sdn Bhd & Sarawak Shell Berhad staffs and contractors to the offshore platforms around Sarawak and Sabah waters.

Fleet
 3 Eurocopter EC225LP Super Puma

External links
 Awan Inspirasi Corporate Website
 Awan Inspirasi Facebook Page

2006 establishments in Malaysia
Airlines of Malaysia
Privately held companies of Malaysia